Tuscarora Township is the name of some places in the U.S. state of Pennsylvania:

Tuscarora Township, Bradford County, Pennsylvania
Tuscarora Township, Juniata County, Pennsylvania
Tuscarora Township, Perry County, Pennsylvania

Pennsylvania township disambiguation pages